The Kmita (plural: Kmitowie) was a magnate family from Little Poland.

History
The progenitor of the family was a noble from Lesser Poland Jasiek z Wiśnicza i Damianic (died after 1363). His son Jan (c. 1340-1376) became starost of and his grandson Piotr voivode of Krakow. Piotrs grandson Dobiesław (died 1478), became Voivode of Lublin and Sandomierz and his nephew Piotr (c. 1442-1505) Grand Marshal of the Crown and voivode of Krakow, as same as his nephew Piotr (ok. 1477–1553), who was also a collaborator of Queen Bona. With his death the Kmita family of Szreniawa has expired.

Notable members
 Jan Kmita z Wiśnicza (died 1376), starost of Kraków
 Piotr Kmita (died 1409), Voivode of Krakow
 Dobiesław Kmita (died 1478), Voivode of Lublin and Sandomierz
 Piotr Kmita z Wiśnicza (1442–1505), Grand Marshal of the Crown, Voivode of Krakow
 Piotr Kmita Sobieński (1477–1553), Grand Marshal of the Crown, Voivode of Krakow
 Daine Kmita Fagoti (1477–1553), Grand Marshal of the Crown, Voivode of Krakow

Coat of arms
The family coat of arms was Szreniawa.

Residences

See also
Kmicic

References